The Cambridge School was established by Mr. Collins and Mrs. Flavia Albuquerque. The school is affiliated to CBSE.

The principal is currently Mrs. Anupama Shetty. The school was established in 2007 and is located at Paldane in Mangalore.

Facilities and amenities 
The various facilities offered by this school are
 Science Lab
 Audio visual Lab
 Swimming pool
 Playground
 Dance classes
 Music classes
 Sports classes
 Arts/craft classes

References

Schools in Mangalore
Educational institutions established in 2007
2007 establishments in Karnataka